Bojan Filipović (Serbian Cyrillic: Бојан Филиповић; born 1 January 1976) is a former Serbian professional footballer. He made a name for himself while playing in his homeland with Obilić from 1999 to 2003, scoring 40 league goals in 118 appearances. He then spent four years with Austrian club Sturm Graz from 2003 to 2007, making 98 league appearances and scoring 19 goals.

Statistics

External links
 
 

1976 births
Living people
Sportspeople from Kruševac
Serbian footballers
Association football midfielders
FK Napredak Kruševac players
FK Obilić players
FK Spartak Subotica players
SK Sturm Graz players
Austrian Football Bundesliga players
Serbian expatriate footballers
Expatriate footballers in Austria